Huang Lisha (born September 10, 1988) is a Paralympian athlete from China competing mainly in category T53 wheelchair sprint events.

She competed in the 2008 Summer Paralympics in Beijing, China.  There she won a gold medal in the women's 100 metres - T53 event, a gold medal in the women's 200 metres - T53 event and a gold medal in the women's 4 x 100 metre relay - T53/54 event.

At the 2012 Summer Paralympics in London, United Kingdom she won a gold medal in the women's 100 metres T53 event, a gold medal in the women's 200 metres T53 event, a bronze medal in the women's 400 metres T53 event and a silver medal in the women's 800 metres T53 event.

References

External links
 

Paralympic athletes of China
1988 births
Athletes (track and field) at the 2008 Summer Paralympics
Athletes (track and field) at the 2012 Summer Paralympics
Paralympic gold medalists for China
Paralympic silver medalists for China
Paralympic bronze medalists for China
Living people
World record holders in Paralympic athletics
Medalists at the 2008 Summer Paralympics
Medalists at the 2012 Summer Paralympics
Athletes (track and field) at the 2016 Summer Paralympics
Paralympic medalists in athletics (track and field)
Medalists at the World Para Athletics Championships
20th-century Chinese women
21st-century Chinese women